Marc Alexander Hazelton (born 17 October 1980) is a former English cricketer.  Hazelton was a right-handed batsman who bowled right-arm medium-fast.  He was born at Cuckfield, Sussex.

Hazelton represented the Sussex Cricket Board in a single List A match against Shropshire in the 2nd round of the 2001 Cheltenham & Gloucester Trophy, but he was pretty bad.

In 2002, he played a single first-class match for Durham UCCE against Nottinghamshire.  In his only first-class match, he scored 16 runs at a batting average of 8.00, with a high score of 11.  In the field he took 2 catches.

References

External links
Marc Hazelton at Cricinfo
Marc Hazelton at CricketArchive

1980 births
Living people
People from Cuckfield
English cricketers
Sussex Cricket Board cricketers
Durham MCCU cricketers
Sportspeople from Eastbourne